Andrzej Buko (born 4 August 1947 in Plonsk) is a Polish medieval archaeologist and professor at the University of Warsaw. Since 2007 he has been the director of the Institute of Archaeology and Ethnology of the Polish Academy of Sciences.

Selected publications
 Wczesnośredniowieczna ceramika sandomierska, Ossolineum, (Wrocław 1981) 
 (wraz z S. Tabaczyńskim) Sandomierz. Starożytność – wczesne średniowiecze, KAW, (Rzeszów 1981)
 Ceramika wczesnopolska. Wprowadzenie do badań, Ossolineum, (Wrocław 1990)
 "Kleczanów. Badania 1989-1992 (red. i współaut.), Scientia (Warszawa 1997)
 "Początki Sandomierza", Letter Quality (Warszawa 1998)
 Archeologia Polski wczesnośredniowiecznej. Odkrycia-hipotezy-interpretacje TRIO, wyd. I (Warszawa 2005), wyd. II (poprawione i uzupełnione), (2006), wyd. III (poszerzone) 2011
 "The Archaeology of Early Medieval Poland. Discoveries-Hypotheses-Interpretations, Brill, (Leiden-Boston 2008) 
 "Stołpie. Tajemnice kamiennej wieży", Letter Quality (Warszawa 2009)
 "Zespół wieżowy w Stołpiu". Badania 2003-2005, (red. i współaut.) Letter Quality, Warszawa 2009
 "Early Medieval Archaeology in Poland: the beginnings and development stages" in European Journal of Post-Classical Archaeologies'', Vol. 2, 2012.

References

Living people
20th-century Polish archaeologists
1947 births
Academic staff of the University of Warsaw
Members of the Polish Academy of Sciences
21st-century Polish archaeologists